Contact is a 1997 American science fiction drama film directed by Robert Zemeckis, based on the 1985 novel by Carl Sagan. Sagan and his wife Ann Druyan wrote the story outline for the film. It stars Jodie Foster as Dr. Eleanor "Ellie" Arroway, a SETI scientist who finds evidence of extraterrestrial life and is chosen to make first contact. It also stars Matthew McConaughey, James Woods, Tom Skerritt, William Fichtner, John Hurt, Angela Bassett, Rob Lowe, Jake Busey, and David Morse. It features the Very Large Array in New Mexico, the Arecibo Observatory in Puerto Rico, the Mir space station, and the Space Coast surrounding Cape Canaveral.

Sagan and Druyan began working on Contact in 1979. They wrote a film treatment over 100 pages long and set up the project at Warner Bros. with Peter Guber and Lynda Obst as producers. When development stalled, Sagan published Contact as a novel in 1985, and the film reentered development in 1989. Roland Joffé and George Miller had planned to direct, but Joffé dropped out in 1993, and Warner Bros. fired Miller in 1995. With Zemeckis as director, filming ran from September 1996 to February 1997. Sony Pictures Imageworks handled most of the visual effects.

Contact was released on July 11, 1997, and grossed over $171 million worldwide. It won the Hugo Award for Best Dramatic Presentation and several Saturn Awards.

Plot

Dr. Ellie Arroway is employed in the SETI program at the Arecibo Observatory in Puerto Rico. She was inspired to pursue a career in science and communication, starting with amateur radio, by her father who has since passed away. Her work involves listening to radio emissions from space in the hopes of finding signs of intelligent extraterrestrial life. The program loses funding after David Drumlin, the President's science advisor, deems it futile. However, Arroway receives financial support from S. R. Hadden, a secretive billionaire industrialist who runs Hadden Industries, which enables her to continue her work at the Very Large Array (VLA) in New Mexico.

Four years later, when Drumlin is about to terminate the SETI program at the VLA, Arroway discovers a signal containing a sequence of prime numbers that appears to have originated from Vega, a star system located approximately 26 light-years away. This announcement leads Drumlin and the National Security Council, headed by Michael Kitz, to attempt to seize control of the facility. Upon further investigation, Arroway's team discovers a video hidden within the signal, which turns out to be Adolf Hitler's opening address at the 1936 Summer Olympics in Berlin, Germany. Arroway and her team hypothesize that this transmission would have been the first to have been strong enough to penetrate the Earth's ionosphere, travel to Vega, and then be sent back to Earth.

The project is put under tight security, and its progress is closely monitored around the world. Arroway discovers that the signal contains over 63,000 pages of encoded data. The elusive S. R. Hadden secretly meets with Arroway and provides her with the means to decode the pages. The decoded data reveals schematics for an intricate machine that is believed to be a form of transportation for a single individual. Multiple nations provide funding for the construction of the machine, which is built at the Kennedy Space Center in Cape Canaveral. An international panel is assembled to select a candidate to travel in the machine. Arroway is a leading candidate until Christian philosopher Palmer Joss, a member of the panel whom she had met and briefly had a romantic relationship with in Puerto Rico, draws attention to her atheism. As a result, the panel selects Drumlin, who is considered to be a better representation of humanity. During the machine's first test, a religious terrorist detonates a bomb, destroying the machine and killing Drumlin and several others.

Hadden, now residing on the Mir space station and dying of cancer, reveals to Arroway that the U.S. government had secretly contracted his company to build a second machine in Japan. As the only American remaining among the candidate pool, Arroway will be the one to go. Equipped with multiple recording devices, Arroway enters the machine's pod, which is then dropped into three rapidly spinning gimbaled rings, causing the pod to seemingly travel through a series of wormholes. Arroway observes a radio array-like structure at Vega and signs of an advanced civilization on another planet. She then finds herself on a beach, similar to a childhood drawing she made of Pensacola, Florida. A figure approaches, taking on the appearance of her deceased father. Arroway recognizes him as an alien assuming her father's form and tries to ask questions. The alien explains that the familiar form and landscape were chosen to make the first contact easier for her and that this journey was just humanity's first step towards joining other spacefaring species.

Arroway loses consciousness as she begins to travel back through a wormhole. When she wakes up, she finds herself lying on the floor of the pod while the mission control team repeatedly tries to contact her. She learns that from the outside, the machine appears to have dropped the pod through its rings and into a safety net. Arroway insists that she was gone for about 18 hours, but her recording devices show only static noise. A Congressional Committee is formed, and they speculate that the signal and machine were a hoax designed by Hadden, who has since passed away. Arroway requests that the committee accept the truth of her testimony on faith. In a private online conversation, Kitz and White House official Rachel Constantine discuss confidential information that although Arroway's recording device only recorded static, it recorded 18 hours of it. Arroway reunites with Joss, and she receives ongoing financial support for the SETI program at the VLA.

Cast
 Jodie Foster as Dr. Eleanor "Ellie" Ann Arroway
 Jena Malone as young Ellie
 Matthew McConaughey as Palmer Joss
 David Morse as Theodore Arroway
 Tom Skerritt as Dr. David Drumlin
 James Woods as Michael Kitz
 John Hurt as S. R. Hadden
 William Fichtner as Kent Clarke, a character derived from Kent Cullers
 Angela Bassett as Rachel Constantine
 Jake Busey as Joseph
 Rob Lowe as Richard Rank
 Geoffrey Blake as Fisher
 Max Martini as Willie
 Steven Ford as Major John Russell
 Jay Leno as himself
 Larry King as himself
 Ann Druyan as herself

Production

Development
Carl Sagan conceived the idea for Contact in 1979. That year, Lynda Obst, one of his closest friends, was hired by film producer Peter Guber as a studio executive for his production company, Casablanca FilmWorks. She pitched Guber the idea for Contact, and he commissioned a development deal.

Sagan and Ann Druyan (who were later married) finished their film treatment in November 1980. Druyan explained:

They added the science and religion analogies as a metaphor of philosophical and intellectual interest in searching for the truth of both humanity and alien contact.

Sagan incorporated Kip Thorne's study of wormhole space travel into the screenplay. The characterization of Ellie Arroway was inspired by Jill Tarter, head of Project Phoenix of the SETI Institute; Jodie Foster researched the lead role by meeting her. The name Ellie was short for Eleanor, which was taken from Eleanor Roosevelt whom both Sagan and Druyan adored; Arroway was selected based on both Voltaire's real name (Arouet), and that Ellie "was going to travel like an arrow through the cosmos", according to Druyan. Tarter served as a consultant on the story, realistically portraying career struggles of women scientists from the 1950s to 1970s. The writers debated whether Arroway should have a baby at the film's end. Although Guber was impressed with Sagan and Druyan's treatment, he hired various screenwriters to rewrite the script. New characters were added, one of them a Native American park ranger turned astronaut. Guber suggested that Arroway have an estranged teenage son, whom he believed would add depth to the storyline. Guber said:

Sagan and Druyan disagreed with Guber's idea, and it was not incorporated into the storyline. In 1982, Guber took Contact to Warner Bros. Pictures, and with the film's development stalled, Sagan started to turn his original idea into a novel, which was published by Simon and Schuster in September 1985. The film adaptation remained in development, and Guber eventually vacated his position at Warner Bros. in 1989.

Guber became the new president of Sony Pictures Entertainment and tried to purchase the film rights of Contact from Warner, but the studio refused. Coincidentally, in 1989, Obst was hired as a new executive at Warner and began to fast-track the film by hiring more writers. Roland Joffé was eventually hired to direct, using a screenplay by James V. Hart. Joffé almost commenced pre-production before he dropped out, and Obst then hired Michael Goldenberg to rewrite the script, who finished his second draft in late 1993. Goldenberg's second draft rekindled Warner Bros. interest in Contact, and Robert Zemeckis was offered the chance to direct, but he turned down the opportunity in favor of making a film based on the life of Harry Houdini. Zemeckis recalled:

In December 1993, Warner Bros. hired George Miller to direct, and Contact commenced pre-production. Miller cast Jodie Foster in the lead role, approached Ralph Fiennes to play Palmer Joss and also considered casting Linda Hunt as the President of the United States. In addition to having aliens put on a laser lighting display around Earth, another version of the Goldenberg scripts had an alien wormhole swallow up the planet, transporting Earth to the center of the galaxy. Miller also asked Goldenberg to rewrite Contact in an attempt to portray the Pope as a key supporting character. Warner Bros. was hoping to have the film ready for release by Christmas 1996, but under Miller's direction pre-production lasted longer than expected. The studio fired the director, blaming pushed-back start dates, budget concerns, and Miller's insistence that the script needed five more weeks of rewriting. Robert Zemeckis, who previously turned down the director's position, decided to accept the offer. Warner Bros. granted Zemeckis total artistic control and the right of final cut privilege. The director cast Matthew McConaughey as Palmer Joss; McConaughey dropped out of the lead role in The Jackal to take the role in Contact. Despite being diagnosed with myelodysplasia in 1994, Sagan continued to be involved in the production of the film. For the cast and main crew members, he conducted an academic conference that depicted a detailed history of astronomy.

During the development of Contact, the production crew watched Stanley Kubrick's 2001: A Space Odyssey (1968) for inspiration.

Filming

Principal photography began on September 24, 1996, and ended on February 28, 1997. The first shooting took place at the Very Large Array (VLA) near Socorro, New Mexico. "Shooting at the VLA was, of course, spectacular but also one of the most difficult aspects of our filming", producer Steve Starkey said. "It is a working facility, so in order for us to accomplish shots for the movie, we had to negotiate with the National Science Foundation for 'dish control' in order to move the dishes in the direction we needed to effect the most dramatic shot for the story." After arduous first weeks of location shooting in New Mexico and Arizona, production for Contact returned to Los Angeles for five months' worth of location and sound stage shooting that used a total of nine soundstages at Warner Bros. Studios in Burbank, and Culver Studios. All together, the art department created more than 25 sets.

In an attempt to create a sense of realism for the storyline, principal CNN news outlet commentators were scripted into Contact. More than 25 news reporters from CNN had roles in the film, and the CNN programs Larry King Live and Crossfire were also included. Ann Druyan makes a cameo appearance as herself, debating with Rob Lowe's character, Richard Rank, on Crossfire. In January 1997, a second unit was sent to Puerto Rico for one week at the Arecibo Observatory.

Other second unit work took place in Fiji, Saint John, US Virgin Islands and Newfoundland, Canada. Also essential to the production were a host of technical consultants from the SETI Institute, the California Institute of Technology, the VLA and a former White House staff member to consult on Washington D.C. and government protocol issues. Sagan visited the set a number of times, where he also helped with last-minute rewrites. Filming was briefly delayed with the news of his death on December 20, 1996. Contact was dedicated to Sagan: "For Carl" appears on the screen at the fade.

Cinematographer Don Burgess shot the film in anamorphic format using Panavision cameras, as well as using large-format 65 mm and VistaVision for special effects shots. The sound designers used Pro Tools software for the audio mixing, which was done at Skywalker Sound.

Visual effects

Designing Contacts visual effects sequences was a joint effort by eight VFX companies, including Sony Pictures Imageworks, Peter Jackson's Weta Digital, George Lucas' Industrial Light & Magic, and Effects Associates, with Pixar's RenderMan used for CGI rendering. Weta Digital, in particular, was responsible for designing the wormhole sequence. Jodie Foster admitted that she had difficulty with blue screen technology because it was a first for her. "It was a blue room. Blue walls, blue roof. It was just blue, blue, blue", Foster explained. "And I was rotated on a Lazy Susan with the camera moving on a computerized arm. It was really tough."

News footage of then-President Bill Clinton was digitally altered to make it appear as if he is speaking about alien contact. This was not the original plan for the film; Zemeckis had initially approached Sidney Poitier to play the president, but the actor turned the role down in favor of The Jackal. Shortly after Poitier's refusal, Zemeckis saw a NASA announcement in August 1996. "Clinton gave his Mars rock speech", the director explained, "and I swear to God it was like it was scripted for this movie. When he said the line 'We will continue to listen closely to what it has to say', I almost died. I stood there with my mouth hanging open."

One notable feature of Contact is its use of digital color correction. This approach helped solve continuity errors during the location shooting at the Very Large Array in New Mexico. "The weather killed us, so we were going back in and changing it enough so that the skies and colors and times of day all seem roughly the same", commented visual effects supervisor Ken Ralston.

The opening scene is a three-minute computer-generated sequence, beginning with a view of Earth from high in the exosphere and listening in on numerous radio broadcasts emitting from the planet. The camera starts zooming backward, passing the Moon, Mars, and other features of the solar system, then to the Oort cloud, interstellar space, the Local Bubble, the Milky Way, other galaxies of the Local Group, and eventually into deep space. As this occurs, the radio signals start to drop out and reflect older programming, representing the distance these signals would have traveled at the speed of light, eventually becoming silent as the distance becomes much greater. The sequence eventually resolves into the iris of young Ellie's eye as she is listening on her amateur radio base station. The scale-view shot of the entire universe was inspired by the short documentary film Powers of Ten (1977). At the time, it was the longest continuous computer-generated sequence in a live-action film, eventually surpassed by the opening of The Day After Tomorrow (2004).

One sequence, with young Ellie running upstairs to try to retrieve her father's medicine, appears to have Ellie running just behind a camera as they move into the bathroom, but the shot resolves to show that this was part of the medicine cabinet mirror's reflection, pulling back to have Ellie open it. It is noted as one of the film's most impressive visual effects due to the seamlessness of the transition. According to Carin-Anne Strohmaier, first assistant film editor, the shot was created through three different plates and digitally manipulated in CGI to create the effect: one plate was from the cameraman leading Ellie, the second of Ellie opening the cabinet door (which was a blue screen instead of a mirror), and the third of the reflection of the photograph of Ellie and her dad when the door closes.

In the sequence with the death of Ellie's father, they planned to use an effect similar to bullet time from The Matrix to show him stopped in time as he died. As the movie was filmed, they found the approach didn't fit the casting or the direction the film was going. They decided it would be most effective to create something distressing but with Ellie's dad absent from the shot, leading to the development of the mirror sequence.

The decoding of the extraterrestrial message, with its architectural drawings of the machine, was created by Ken Ralston and Sony Pictures Imageworks. It was Zemeckis's and Ralston's sixth film collaboration. Imageworks created more than 350 visual effect shots, using a combination of model and miniature shots and digital graphics. On designing the Machine, Zemeckis said, "The Machine in Sagan's novel was somewhat vague, which is fine for a book. In a movie, though, if you're going to build a giant physical structure of alien design, you have to make it believable... It had to be huge, so that the audience would feel like it was bigger than man should be tinkering with. It had to look absolutely real." The machine was then designed by concept artist Steve Burg, reusing a design he created as a "time-displacement device" for an unused scene in Terminator 2.

Early conceptual designs of the Pod were based, as in the novel, on one of the primary shapes in geometry: a dodecahedron, or a twelve-sided body. Eventually it was modified to a spherical capsule that encased the traveler, with a dodecahedron surrounding the sphere. Zemeckis and the production crew also made several visits to the Kennedy Space Center at Merritt Island adjacent to Cape Canaveral, where officials gave them access to sites off-limits to most visitors. Filmmakers were also brought onto Launch Complex 39 before the launch of the Space Shuttle, where they studied the mechanics of the elevator, gantry area and loading arm for the design of the Machine's surrounding supports and gantry. Once the concept met with the filmmakers' approval, physical construction began on the sets for the Pod, elevator interior and gantry, which took almost four months. The rest of the effects were compiled digitally by Imageworks.

The climactic scene depicting the mysterious beach near the galactic core where Arroway makes contact, in particular, called for major visual innovations. The goal was an idyllic seashore with a sky blazing with stars that might exist near the core of the galaxy. Ralston said that "the thought was that this beach would have a heightened reality. One that might make the everyday world seem like a vague daydream." To keep the question alive whether any of it was real in Arroway's mind, elements such as ocean waves running in reverse and palm tree shadows swaying with sped-up motion were applied.

The Hitler newsreel also required digital manipulation.

Music

The original score was composed by Alan Silvestri, most of which was released on August 19, 1997, by Warner Bros. Records. The full score is approximately an hour long, 44 minutes of which is on the CD, including every major cue. The CD track entitled "Good to Go" features a slightly different opening—a brief brass motif that is not in the film—but all other cues are identical in orchestration to the mix in the film.

The Region 2 Special Edition DVD release contains a 5.1 isolated score track, which presents the complete score (this feature, as with many isolated scores, is not mentioned in most product descriptions of the DVD).

Themes
Contact often suggests that cultural conflicts between religion and science would be brought to the fore by the apparent contact with aliens that occurs in the film. A point of discussion is the existence of God, with several different positions being portrayed. A description of an emotionally intense experience by Palmer Joss, which he describes as seeing God, is met by Arroway's suggestion that "some part of [him] needed to have it"—that it was a significant personal experience but indicative of nothing greater. Joss compares his certainty that God exists to Arroway's certainty that she loved her deceased father, despite her being unable to prove it.

Contact depicts intense debate occurring as a result of the apparent contact with aliens. Many clips of well-known debate shows such as Crossfire and Larry King Live are shown, with participants discussing the implications of the message, asking whether it is proof of the existence of alien life or of God, and whether science is encroaching upon religious ground by, as one believer puts it, "talking to your god for you". The head of a religious organization casts doubt on the morality of building the machine, noting: "We don't even know whether [the aliens] believe in God." The first machine is ultimately destroyed by a religious extremist, in the belief that building it was detrimental to humankind.

Although the revelation at the end of the film that Arroway's recording device recorded approximately 18 hours of noise is arguably conclusive proof of the fact of—if not the experience of—her "journey", several coincidences and indications throughout the film cast doubt on its authenticity. Director Robert Zemeckis indicated: "The point of the movie is for there always to be a certain amount of doubt [as to whether the aliens were real]." These indications consist mostly of visual cues during the "journey" that echo Ellie's experiences earlier in the film (which Ellie believed to be the result of the aliens "downloading [her] thoughts and memories"), but the timing of the message's arrival and its eventual decoding are also highly coincidental: the message was first received shortly before Arroway and her team were to be ejected from the VLA facility and was successfully decoded only by S. R. Hadden (Arroway's only sponsor, who was close to death from cancer) after weeks of failed attempts by the team at the VLA.

At the end of the film, Arroway is put into a position that she had traditionally viewed with skepticism and contempt: that of believing something with complete certainty, despite being unable to prove it in the face of not only widespread incredulity and skepticism (which she admits that as a scientist she would normally share) but also evidence apparently to the contrary.

Zemeckis stated that he intended the message of the film to be that science and religion can coexist rather than being opposing camps, as shown by the coupling of scientist Arroway with the religious Joss, as well as his acceptance that the "journey" indeed took place. This, and scattered references throughout the film, posit that science and religion are not nominally incompatible: one interviewer, after asking Arroway whether the construction of the machine—despite not knowing what will happen when it is activated—is too dangerous, suggests that it is being built on the "faith" that the alien designers, as Arroway puts it, "know what they're doing".

Release and reception

Contacts release in July 1997 rekindled public interest in Sagan's 1985 novel. The book remained on The New York Times Best Seller list from July 27 to September 21, 1997.

Box office
Contact premiered on July 1, 1997, at the Village Theater in Los Angeles, California. It was released in the United States and Canada on July 11, 1997, in 1,923 theaters, earning $20,584,908 in its opening weekend. It eventually grossed $100,920,329 in North America and $70,200,000 in foreign countries, reaching a worldwide total of $171,120,329.

Home video
Contact was released on LaserDisc, VHS and the (then new) DVD format in December 1997. Among the special features are three audio commentaries: by director Zemeckis and producer Starkey, by visual effects supervisors Ken Ralston and Stephen Rosenbaum, and by star Jodie Foster. Contact was released on Blu-ray Disc on October 6, 2009.

Critical reception
On the basis of 68 reviews collected by Rotten Tomatoes, 68% of critics gave positive reviews, with an average score of 6.9/10. The critical consensus reads, "Contact elucidates stirring scientific concepts and theological inquiry at the expense of satisfying storytelling, making for a brainy blockbuster that engages with its ideas, if not its characters." Metacritic calculated an average score of 62 out of 100, based on 23 reviews, denoting "generally favorable reviews". Audiences polled by CinemaScore gave the film an average grade of "A-" on an A+ to F scale.

Roger Ebert, who gave the film three-and-a-half stars out of four, said that "Sagan's novel Contact provides the inspiration for Robert Zemeckis' new film, which tells the smartest and most absorbing story about extraterrestrial intelligence since Close Encounters of the Third Kind (1977). "Movies like Contact help explain why movies like Independence Day leave me feeling empty and unsatisfied", Ebert commented. On December 21, 2011, Ebert added Contact to his "Great Movies" collection.

Kenneth Turan of the Los Angeles Times said that the film carried a more philosophical portrait of the science fiction genre than did other films, but still managed "to satisfy the cravings of the general public who simply want to be entertained". Internet reviewer James Berardinelli said that Contact is "one of 1997's finest motion pictures, and is a forceful reminder that Hollywood is still capable of making magic". Berardinelli likened its awe and spectacle to Stanley Kubrick's 2001: A Space Odyssey, while adding that "If Contact falls short in any area, it's an inability to fully develop all of its many subplots..." Mick LaSalle of the San Francisco Chronicle largely enjoyed the first 90 minutes of Contact but felt that director Robert Zemeckis was too obsessed with visual effects rather than cohesive storytelling for the pivotal climax.

Rita Kempley, writing in The Washington Post, did not like the film's main premise, which she described as "a preachy debate between sanctity and science".

Awards

Controversies

Bill Clinton
In 1984, a meteorite, thought to be from Mars, was found in Antarctica. Twelve years later, an article by NASA scientist David S. McKay was published in the journal Science, proposing that the meteorite might contain evidence for microscopic fossils of Martian bacteria (later, a disputed interpretation). The announcement made headlines around the world, and the following day, on August 7, 1996, during a press conference about the news, the President of the United States, Bill Clinton, made remarks that were in places sufficiently generic in nature to allow fragments of his videotaped statement to be included in Contact, implying that Clinton was ostensibly speaking about contact with extraterrestrial life, congruent with the film's story:

Later in the film, a separate fragment of generic remarks by President Clinton, speaking about Saddam Hussein and Iraq at a different press conference in October 1994, was lifted out of context and inserted into Contact:

On July 14, 1997, three days after the film opened in the United States, Warner Bros. received a letter from White House Counsel Charles Ruff protesting against the use of Clinton's digitally-composited appearance. The letter made no demands, but called the duration and manner of Clinton's appearance "inappropriate". No legal action was planned; the White House Counsel simply wanted to send a message to Hollywood to avoid unauthorized uses of the President's image. Zemeckis was reminded that official White House policy "prohibits the use of the President in any way ... (that) implies a direct ... connection between the President and a commercial product or service".

A Warner Bros. spokeswoman explained: "We feel we have been completely frank and upfront with the White House on this issue. They saw scripts, they were notified when the film was completed, they were sent a print well in advance of the film's July 11 opening, and we have confirmation that a print was received there July 2." However, Warner Bros. did concede that they never pursued or received formal release from the White House for the use of Clinton's image. While the Counsel commented that parody and satire are protected under the First Amendment, press secretary Mike McCurry believed that "there is a difference when the President's image, which is his alone to control, is used in a way that would lead the viewer to believe he has said something he really didn't say".

CNN
Shortly after the White House's complaint, CNN chairman, president, and CEO Tom Johnson announced he believed that in hindsight it was a mistake to allow 13 members of CNN's on-air staff (including John Holliman, Larry King and Bernard Shaw) to appear in the film, even though both CNN and Warner Bros. are owned by Time Warner. Johnson added that, for Contact, the CNN presence "creates the impression that we're manipulated by Time Warner, and it blurs the line". CNN then changed their policies for future films, which now require potential appearances to be cleared through their ethics group.

Lawsuits
Director George Miller, who had developed Contact with Warner Bros. before Zemeckis' hiring, unsuccessfully sued the studio over breach of contract policies.

During filming on December 28, 1996, filmmaker Francis Ford Coppola filed a lawsuit against Warner Bros. and Sagan, who had died the previous week. Coppola claimed that Sagan's novel was based on a story the pair had developed for a television special back in 1975, titled First Contact. Under their development agreement, Coppola and Sagan were to split proceeds from the project, as well as from any novel Sagan would write, with American Zoetrope and the Children's Television Workshop. The TV program was never produced, but in 1985, Simon and Schuster published Contact, and Warner moved forward with development of a film adaptation. Coppola sought at least $250,000 in compensatory damages and an injunction against production or distribution of the film.

In February 1998, Los Angeles Superior Court Judge Ricardo Torres dismissed Coppola's claim. Although Torres agreed that Sagan violated some terms of the contract, he explained that Coppola waited too long to file his lawsuit, and that the contract might not be enforceable as it was written. Coppola then appealed his suit, taking it to the California Courts of Appeal (CCA). In April 2000, the CCA dismissed his suit, finding that Coppola's claims were barred because they were brought too late. The court noted that it was not until 1994 that the filmmaker thought about suing over Contact.

NASA
The scene where the NASA scientists give Arroway the "cyanide pill" caused some controversy during production and when the film came out. Gerald D. Griffin, the film's NASA advisor, insisted that NASA has never given any astronaut a cyanide pill "just in case", and that if an astronaut truly wished to commit suicide in space, all they would have to do is cut off their oxygen supply. However, Carl Sagan insisted that NASA did indeed give out cyanide pills, and they did it for every mission an astronaut has ever flown. Zemeckis said that because of the two radically different assertions, the truth is unknown, but he left the suicide pill scene in the movie, as it seemed more suspenseful that way, and it was also in line with Sagan's beliefs and vision of the film. Along with being NASA Technical Consultant for the project, Griffin had a cameo in the role of "Dynamics" in Mission Control. He was a technical advisor for Ron Howard's 1995 film Apollo 13. While working for NASA during the Apollo Program, he was a flight director for that mission, among others, and in the 1980s was director of the Johnson Space Center.

SETI
SETI.org published a review of the film in 2011, where they gave a side-by-side chart of a few relevant details from the film, and how they differed from reality. One example being that, despite having 27 radio telescopes, the VLA is actually smaller and less sensitive than the Arecibo Observatory—making Arecibo a better location for SETI work, if possibly a less photogenic filming location than the VLA. Despite these small inconsistencies, they maintained that "Contact is indescribably more accurate in its depiction of SETI than any Hollywood film in history."

See also
 "The Borderland" (The Outer Limits episode)
 
 
 List of films featuring extraterrestrials

References

Further reading
 
 Tibbetts, John C., and James M. Welsh, eds. The Encyclopedia of Novels Into Film (2nd ed. 2005) pp 69–72.

External links
 
 
 
 
 
 Cinematography analysis
 Visual effects analysis
 September 8, 1995 screenplay
 In-depth analysis of the realism of the film and novel
 SETI Institute - Contact the Movie
 On Location: Revisiting Contact - a Tribute to Carl Sagan

1990s American films
1990s science fiction drama films
1997 drama films
1997 films
American science fiction drama films
Cultural depictions of Bill Clinton
1990s English-language films
Films about scientists
Films directed by Robert Zemeckis
Films scored by Alan Silvestri
Films based on science fiction novels
Films set in Florida
Films set in Hokkaido
Films set in New Mexico
Films set in Puerto Rico
Films set in Washington, D.C.
Films set in Wisconsin
Films shot in Arizona
Films shot in Florida
Films shot in New Mexico
Films shot in Puerto Rico
Films shot in Virginia
Films with atheism-related themes
Films about extraterrestrial life
Fiction set around Vega
Films with screenplays by Michael Goldenberg
Films about wormholes
Hard science fiction films
Hugo Award for Best Dramatic Presentation winning works
Philosophical fiction
Works by Carl Sagan
Warner Bros. films
Search for extraterrestrial intelligence in film and television
Films produced by Robert Zemeckis